A finger lake, also known as a fjord lake or trough lake, is "a narrow linear body of water occupying a glacially overdeepened valley and sometimes impounded by a morainic dam." Where one end of a finger lake is drowned by the sea, it becomes a fjord or sea-loch.

Examples

New Zealand 

 Lake Wakatipu, Otago, South Island.

United Kingdom

England 
 Many of the lakes of the Lake District are finger lakes.

Scotland 

 Many lochs of Scotland are finger lakes. Some like Loch Broom and Loch Maree form fjord and finger lake systems.

Wales 
 Many of the Welsh llyns.

United States 
 Finger Lakes, New York State

See also 
 Zungenbecken

References

Literature 
Hamblin, P.F. and Carmack, E.C., 1978. River‐induced currents in a Fjord Lake. Journal of Geophysical Research: Oceans, 83(C2), pp. 885–899.
 Kotlyakov, Vladimir and Anna Komarova, Elsevier's Dictionary of Geography: in English, Russian, French, Spanish and German. Amsterdam: Elsevier, 2007. .
 Whittow, John (1984). Dictionary of Physical Geography. London: Penguin, 1984. .

Glacial landforms
Lakes by type